West Mambalam is a residential and commercial area in Chennai, India. It is known for its shops, bazaars and Hindu temples. It is bounded by Kodambakkam to the north and Saidapet to the south. T. Nagar and Nandanam stretch all along its eastern frontiers while Ashok Nagar lies to its west. The Ayodhya Mandapam is an important landmark.

Etymology
Mambalam is believed to have derived its name from the existence of Maha vilvam trees in the locality, which in due course become Mavilam and then Mambalam

In ancient times it was known as Mylai mel ambalam (place located on the west of Mylai). Then it changed to mel-ambalam. Then mel(top) changed into west and ambalam changed into Mambalam. With the railway line dividing the locality into East Mambalam and West Mambalam, and with East Mambalam having renamed as "Thyagaraya Nagar," the western part continues to be known as "West Mambalam" today.

History 
Prior to its inclusion in the then city of Madras, Mambalam was a village in the Saidapet taluk of Chingleput district. The oldest surviving reference to Mambalam is believed to be in a 1726 stone plaque commemorating the construction of the Marmalong Bridge (now known as Maraimalai Adigal Bridge) across the Adyar river by the merchant Coja Petrus Uscan. The bridge is believed to have been named after the village of Marmalong or Marmalan identified with Mambalam. The village was, then, a zamindari administered by zamindars belonging to a Telugu-speaking Reddi family.

Urbanisation of Mambalam was started in 1911 with the construction of the Mambalam railway station on the Madras-Kanchipuram railroad. The Long Tank, which formed the western frontier of Madras city, was drained out in 1923. The same year, the administration of Mambalam was handed over to the British by its zamindar. The township of Theagaraya Nagar, popularly known as T. Nagar, was constructed in the southern part of the zamindari during 1923–25. The townships of Mambalam and Theagaraya Nagar covering an area of 1.008 sq. miles were included in the Mambalam division of Madras city. These outlying residential suburbs were connected to the rest of the city by an effective bus service. The areas surrounding Arya Gowda Road (originally the Ari Gowder Road) were obtained from Badaga leader and politician H. B. Ari Gowder. In its early days, Mambalam was affected by sanitation issues and was notorious for its filaria epidemics. This area was annexed to Chennai in 1946.

Starting from the 1960s, Mambalam grew into a middle-class residential neighbourhood in counterbalance to the sister-township of Theagaraya Nagar which was evolving into a busy shopping district.

Corporation ward office
Mambalam has 3 corporation wards under the old zone of 8 and new zone 10. Ward no 123/133 and 125/135  comes under T.Nagar Constituency and Ward no 133/140 comes under Saidapet Constituency of South Chennai
 123/133 - Ram Colony
 125/135 - Thambiah Reddy Road
 133/140 - Reddy Kuppam road

Revenue Taluk and Police Station
Revenue Taluk
Mambalam comes under the Taluk of Mambalam which is situated in K.K. Nagar.

Police Station
Mambalam comes under the jurisdiction of R3 Ashok Nagar police station which serves people in and around Ayodhya Mandapam. Whereas R6 Kumaran Nagar police station serves people of Mambalam near Jafferkhanpet and Saidapet West.

Nearest Fire Service and Rescue Station is in Ashok Nagar.

Transport
West Mambalam is served by Mambalam railway station (the busiest station after Chennai Central, Egmore and Tambaram), providing access to Chennai Central, Chennai Egmore and Tambaram. The nearest bus terminus is T. Nagar. The bus service connects the area to K.K.Nagar, Vadapalani, Iyyppanthangal, Poonamallee, T. Nagar and Broadway (via Postal Colony), Mylapore and Vallalar Nagar (via Rangarajapuram) and Saligramam (via Brindavan Street), West Saidapet and Besant Nagar (via Mettupalayam). Other less frequent services connect the area to Taramani, Guindy Industrial Estate, Pattabiram, Tollgate and Kundrathur. Addition to that Small bus operated between Ashok Pillar to Liberty via 4th and 7th avenue of Ashok Nagar, Ayodhya Mandapam, Rangarajapuram. Nearest Metro Rail Station is Ashok Nagar.

Only 4 buses pass through this area, which connects to Broadway, Iyappanthangal, KK nagar etc.

Mambalam comes under RTO West which is situated K.K. Nagar next to Mambalam Taluk building.
The Licence Registration is TN-09.

Playgrounds
In Bhakthavathchalam street in Mambalam there is a playground popularly referred to as "Thambiah Reddy Ground". It is a relatively small ground and generally only cricket is played there. Many parks are also there. One of the parks is situated in Elliamman Koil Street and the park is called 'Kittu Park'.
Cartman Street West Mambalam most famous football ground which is called "PSN ground".

Landmarks
Temples: There are many historical temples which are more than 100 years old.

Ayodhya Mandapam which is said to be the place of vocalist offers place for many cultural events and many more for those who are religious. Other temples include Sathya Narayana Kovil, Kasi Viswanathar Koil, Kodhandaramar temple, Pushpa Vinayagar Kovil, Adhi Kesava Perumal Temple near Govindan Road, Muragashramam, Shree Muthu Mari Amman Temple(Ganapathy Street), Shree Jaya Muthu Mari Amman Temple(Brindavanam Street), Shree Periyapalayathu Amman Temple(Nr.Dhuraisamy Subway), Mahaganapathy temple (Arya Gowder road), Kali bari temple (Kali bari is a miniature replica of the famous Dakshineswar Kali Temple near Kolkata.). There is also a Shirdi Sai Baba temple (Jai Shankar Street), an Annai meditation center and GMCKS (Pranic Energy Healing with Meditation in No.9/6 Mahadevan St. West Mambalam Center) (serving the needy for All Chronic diseases and related Psychological problems.)

Mosque: Mosque is located in Chakrapani Street extension.

Church: ECI Church is located in Govindan road at Mettupalayam Bus Stop
"Church" Advent Church is located in Pal more street West Mambalam Subway Bus Stop.

Schools: SBSM Jain School, Ahobila Mutt Oriental School, JGHV School, Sitaram Vidhyalaya, Anjugam, Little Oxford, Sri Narayana Mission School, SRM Nightingale, GRT Mahalakshmi School, Hindu Vidhyalaya, Oxford Matriculation Higher Secondary School.

Theater: There is a one oldest theater in Mambalam called Srinivasa Theater. Another theater was there named National Theater which demolished in later 90's which was situated in Lake View Road

Sanskrit Research Centre: Fellowship of Sanskrit Culture, Sanskrit Teachers' Association, Sanskrit Research Centre are all located in one roof (37/16A Arangappan St) near Srinivasa theatre.

Notable People from Mambalam 
 Ravichandran Ashwin: Indian Cricketer
 T.N.Seshagopalan : Carnatic Musician
 Komal Swaminathan: Tamil Playwright & Writer
 Ananthu: Screenwriter, Film director

Location in context

References 

 Ashoka Mithran (7 March 2009). "The Glorious West Mambalam". Chennai Online.
 Article on T. Nagar in The Hindu Business Line

Neighbourhoods in Chennai
Cities and towns in Chennai district